Lithurgopsis apicalis, the orange-tipped woodborer, is a species of woodborer bee in the family Megachilidae.

References

Further reading

 

Megachilidae